A lightweight protocol in computer networking is a communication protocol that is characterized by a relatively small overhead (caused e.g. by bulky metadata) in transmitted on top of the functional data:

 Lightweight Directory Access Protocol
 Lightweight Extensible Authentication Protocol
 Lightweight Presentation Protocol
 Internet Content Adaptation Protocol
 Skinny Client Control Protocol
 OpenLDAP

Network protocols